Haukefjellet  is a mountain in southern Norway. Haukefjellet is located on the boundary between Lærdal in Sogn og Fjordane and 
Hemsedal in Buskerud.

See also
Mountains in Buskerud (Norwegian)

References

Mountains of Viken
Mountains of Vestland
Lærdal
Hemsedal